Yonah Alexander (born 25 December 1931) is an author and lecturer who specializes in the study of terrorism.

Educational background 
Alexander received his PhD from Columbia University, an MA from the University of Chicago, and his BA from Roosevelt University of Chicago.

Academic journals 
Alexander has founded and edited the journals Terrorism An International Journal in 1977, International Journal on Minorities and Group Rights

Biodefense 
Yonah also serves as a member of the Bipartisan Commission on Biodefense, a group that encourages and advocates changes to government policy to strengthen national biodefense. In order to address biological threats facing the nation, the Commission created a 33 step initiative for the U.S. Government to implement. Headed by former Senator Joe Lieberman and former Governor Tom Ridge, the Commission assembled in 2014 in Washington D.C. for four meetings concerning current biodefense programs and concluded that the federal government had little to no defense mechanisms in case of a biological event. The Commission report, The National Blueprint for Biodefense, proposes a string of solutions and recommendations for the U.S. Government to take, including items such as giving the Vice President authority over biodefense responsibilities and merging the entire biodefense budget. These solutions represent the Commission's call to action in order to increase awareness and activity for pandemic related issues.

Published works
 Combating terrorism: strategies of ten countries University of Michigan Press 31 August 2002. 
 Europe's red terrorists: the fighting communist organizations Routledge 1 October 1992. 
 The New Iranian Leadership: Ahmadinejad, Nuclear Ambition, and the Middle East Praeger 30 December 2007. 
 Turkey: Terrorism, Civil Rights, and the European Union Routledge.

Notes

References

 Schmid, lex Peter, Jongman, A. J. Political Terrorism: A New Guide to Actors, Authors, Concepts, Data Bases, Theories, and Literature Transaction Revised edition. 28 February 2005. 
 Alexander Yonah, Swetnam Michael S.Usama Bin Laden's "Al-Qaida": Profile of a Terrorist Network Transnational Publishers 1 April 2001.

External links

Terrorism theorists
Living people
Columbia University alumni
University of Chicago alumni
Roosevelt University alumni
1931 births